S. Alexander (Alex) Haslam  (born 1962) is a professor of psychology and ARC Australian Laureate Fellow in the School of Psychology at the University of Queensland.

His research focuses on areas of social psychology, organisational psychology and health psychology, exploring issues of stereotyping and prejudice, tyranny and resistance, leadership and power, stress and well-being. This work is informed by, and has contributed to the development of, theory and ideas relating to the social identity approach.

Career
Haslam grew up in Elsenham, Essex and completed his secondary education at Felsted School. He holds a Master of Arts (MA) degree from the University of St Andrews and a PhD from Macquarie University (Sydney). His doctoral work at Macquarie was supervised by John Turner (psychologist) and funded by a Commonwealth Scholarship. This was preceded by a year as a Robert T Jones scholar at Emory University (Atlanta). Prior to his current appointment at the University of Queensland, Haslam worked at the Australian National University (Canberra) (1991–2001) and the University of Exeter (2001–2012).

Haslam is a recipient of the European Association of Social Psychology's Kurt Lewin Medal (2005), the British Psychology Society's Presidents' Award for distinguished contributions to psychological knowledge (2016), the International Society of Political Psychology's Nevitt Sanford Award for distinguished contribution to political psychology (2017), and the Australian Psychological Society's Award for distinguished contribution to psychological science (2018). In 2009 he was granted the British Psychological Society's Award for Excellence in the Teaching of Psychology, and a National Teaching Fellowship from the Higher Education Academy. He was an Associate Editor of the British Journal of Social Psychology from 1999 to 2001 and Editor-in-Chief of the European Journal of Social Psychology from 2001 to 2005, and President of the psychology section of the British Science Association from 2009 to 2010. He is currently an Associate Editor of Leadership Quarterly (from 2017).

Key research projects

The BBC Prison Study
In 2001, Haslam collaborated with Steve Reicher (University of St Andrews) on the BBC television programme The Experiment (which became known as the "BBC Prison Study"). This examined the behaviour of a group of individuals within a simulated prison environment, returning to issues raised by the Stanford Prison Experiment (SPE). Amongst other things, the study's findings challenged the role account of tyranny associated with the SPE as well as broader ideas surrounding the "banality of evil". The core insight from the study was that tyranny results from the engaged followership of subordinates rather than blind conformity to roles or rules. Recent work has also demonstrated that the same analysis can explain the behaviour of participants in Milgram's Obedience to Authority experiments.

The new psychology of leadership
Since the 1990s, Haslam has collaborated with a number of social identity researchers, notably Steve Reicher, Michael Platow, and John Turner, developing a social identity analysis of leadership. This work focuses on the role of perceived shared identity as a basis for mutual influence between leaders and followers. It argues that leaders' success hinges on their ability to create, represent, advance and embed a social identity that is shared with those they seek to motivate and inspire.

One of the first characteristics of creating a shared identity is prototypicality, meaning that the leader represents the qualities and the characteristics that a group wants embodied in the leader. The group must resonate with the individual who is prototypical, meaning that individuals in the group sees idealized characteristics of him/herself in the leader. In-group "prototypicality" is more important than "stereotypical" leadership characteristics, such as those of the "great man" leadership style. "Leaders must represent us."

Another characteristic of social identity research is self-categorization theory, which relies on the idea that an individual in-group member must be representative of group culture as a whole, and possesses characteristics that distinguish in-group members from out-group members. The group's identity keeps it together because the sense of in-group togetherness is desirable, and separates the individual from "them" or those who are members of the out-group. Individuals "depersonalize" to the extent that they give up a sense of being an outsider and desire to become an in-group member.

Haslam et al. argue that in order for leaders to be effective, they need to show fairness within their in-group members but should favor in-group members over other out-groups. To engage followers, leaders' actions and visions must promote the group's interests as they should be aware of the group's own norms and values. Leaders will be described by their followers as charismatic, will receive endorsement and acknowledgement from followers, will influence their follower's opinions and will be able to convince their followers to contribute to the team's future visions and actions.  

Leaders are seen as entrepreneurs of identity. They create and develop a specific identity of the group. Reality and social context play a big role in effective leadership as they must be seen by the group to match the leaders' words and actions. This is a continuously changing and active process and it connects identity, leadership and reality. An "entrepreneur leader" is dynamic and goes with the flow, being able to adapt with the changes of reality, staying coherent with the group's identity.

Along with leaders being entrepreneurs of identity, it is just as important for them to be embedders of identity as well. Successfully ingraining an identity for a particular in-group, helps followers become conscious of their shared social identity and what values and behaviors are being represented. Haslam et al. suggest that leaders can achieve this by serving as artists, impresarios, and engineers of identity. An individual's word choice, presence, ability to engage followers in the new vision, and commitment to building a solid structure of identity and culture play a crucial part in fulfilling those roles. In short, leaders should not only represent the values of the group, they must also make them their own, in an effort to grow the group that they seek to represent.

In 2012 the researchers received the University of San Diego – International Leadership Association Outstanding Leadership Book Award for The New Psychology of Leadership.

The glass cliff
Haslam has worked with Michelle K. Ryan on the leadership experiences of women and together they coined the term "glass cliff" to describe some of their key findings – specifically, evidence that women are more likely than men to be appointed to leadership roles in organisations that are performing poorly. This was short-listed for the Times Higher Education "Research Project of the Year" in 2005.

The social cure
Haslam's more recent work (funded by the Australian Research Council ) has contributed to the development of the Social Identity Approach to health and well-being, also referred to as "The Social Cure"(including the Integrated Social Identity model of Stress; ISIS). This work argues that the sense of social identity derived from shared group membership is a basis not only for individuals to have a sense of meaning and purpose in their lives, but also for them to receive and benefit from social support. It is also a basis for them to work together to overcome stressors rather than succumb to them.

Awards and honors
In 2011, he was awarded an Australian Laureate Fellowship. He was appointed a Member of the Order of Australia in the 2022 Australia Day Honours for "significant service to tertiary education, particularly psychology, though research and mentoring".

Selected publications

Monographs
Oakes, P. J., Haslam, S. A., & Turner, J. C. (1994). Stereotyping and social reality. Oxford: Blackwell.
Haslam, S. A., & McGarty, C. (2003). Research methods and statistics in psychology. London and Thousand Oaks, CA: Sage.
Haslam, S. A. (2001). Psychology in organisations: The social identity approach. London: Sage. (2nd ed. 2004)
Haslam, S. A., Reicher, S. D. & Platow, M. J. (2011). The new psychology of leadership: Identity, influence and power. London: Psychology Press. (2nd ed. 2020)
Haslam, C., Jetten, J., Cruwys, T., Dingle, G. A., & Haslam, S. A. (2018). The new psychology of health: Unlocking the social cure. London: Routledge.

Edited books
McGarty, C., & Haslam, S. A. (Eds.) (1997). The message of social psychology: Perspectives on mind in society. Oxford: Blackwell.
Spears, R., Oakes, P. J., Ellemers, N., & Haslam, S. A. (Eds.) (1997). The social psychology of stereotyping and group life. Oxford: Blackwell.
Haslam, S. A., van Knippenberg, D., Platow, M., & Ellemers, N. (Eds.) (2003). Social identity at work: Developing theory for organizational practice. New York and Hove: Psychology Press.
Jetten, J., Haslam, C., & Haslam, S. A. (Eds.) (2012). The social cure: Identity, health and well-being. New York and Hove: Psychology Press.
Smith, J. R., & Haslam, S. A. (Eds.) (2012). Social psychology: Revisiting the classic studies. London: Sage. (2nd ed, 2017)

References

External links
Official website of the BBC Prison Study

1962 births
Living people
British psychologists
Members of the Order of Australia
People educated at Felsted School
Alumni of the University of St Andrews
Academics of the University of Exeter
Academic staff of the University of Queensland
Australian psychologists